Perryville Falls is a privately owned  tall waterfall near Perryville, New York, on the Canaseraga Creek.

Description 

History 
A visitor wrote in an 1871 sketch that "No one with any love of nature can afford to stop here without visiting Perryville Falls, for nature is generous in her wild and grand gifts." In 1890 a Justin explosive cartridge was tested at the falls in a  rifle. In 1922 the American Journal of Botany reported that the area around the falls held populations of Asplenium scolopendrium.

By 1966 they were described in The Post-Standard as "one of the few high falls not taken over by the state." Such injuries became increasingly common throughout the 1970s; by 1977 nine people had injured by falling in the past decade and the falls were a common site of teen partying, underage drinking and cannabis smoking. On May 4, 1977, the Sullivan town board voted to mark the area off with 'no parking' and 'no trespassing' signs and close an access road after multiple requests to do so by town residents.

References 

Waterfalls of New York (state)